Yan Vitalyevich Skibsky (born 25 December 2002) is a Belarusian footballer who plays for Vitebsk.

References

External links

2002 births
Living people
People from Chashniki
Sportspeople from Vitebsk Region
Belarusian footballers
Association football defenders
FC Vitebsk players